Ntsadjéni is a village on the island of Grande Comore in the Comoros. According to the 2021 census the village had a population of 20000

References

Populated places in Grande Comore